Rashid Behbudov Street is an  arterial road in central Baku, Azerbaijan, named after famed Azerbaijani singer Rashid Behbudov. It begins at the south end of the Sabayil district of Baku and continues north, terminating at intersection with Bakikhanov Street intersecting Uzeyir Hajibeyov Street.

Overview of the street
The former names of the street include "Budagovskaya", "Kaspiyskaya", "Lieutenant Schmidt". It was renamed after a renowned Azerbaijani singer and actor Rashid Behbudov. It stretches . Connecting Neftchiler Avenue in Baku downtown via stretch of Bakikhanov street to Tbilisi Avenue, which leads to northern entrance of Baku. Rashid Behbudov Street is heavy with traffic throughout the day. Both OVIR (Department of Visas and Registration) issuing passports and Azerbaijan University of Languages are located on Rashid Behbudov street, which causes more traffic during the academic year, due to the increased number of commuting students and incoming citizens from other parts of the country to register their passports.

The southern part of the street has many buildings from the 19th century with many boutiques, shops and upscale restaurants, whereas the northern part is seen with newly built high-rise buildings.

Notable buildings and monuments located on the avenue include

 Music School No.2 named after Rashid Behbudov
 Rashid Behbudov Song Theater
 School No. 8
 Central Bank of Azerbaijan
 Shahriyar House of Culture
 Azerbaijani Musical Arts Museum 
 Jazz Center of Baku
 Aquapark
 Azerbaijan University of Languages
 Department of Visas and Registration (also called OVIR)
 Former 26 Commissars Memorial

Picture gallery

External links
Old street and square names in Baku

Streets in Baku